Bobruichanka Bobruisk is a Belarusian women's football club from Bobruisk. The club is one of the most successful women's team in Belarus, as it won the Belarusian Premier League several times.

History
The team has won eight championships in a row from 1997 to 2004. After that Universitet Vitebsk and Zorka-BDU shared 5 titles. In 2010 Bobruichanka again won the league and thus qualified for the 2011–12 UEFA Women's Champions League.

Historical names 
 1991–92 – Trikotazhnitsa
 1993–95 – Trikotazhnitsa-Ornina
 1996 – Belcar
 Since 1997 – Bobruichanka

First Team Squad

Former players

UEFA Women's Champions League Record

Titles
Belarusian Premier League:
 Winners (11): 1997, 1998, 1999, 2000, 2001, 2002, 2003, 2004, 2010, 2011, 2012
Belarusian Women's Cup:
 Winners (10): 1995, 1996, 1997, 1998, 1999, 2000, 2001, 2002, 2003, 2008
Belarusian Women's Super Cup:
 Winners (2): 2011, 2012
1995 cup title as Trikotazhnitsa Bobruisk.

References

External links

Women's football clubs in Belarus